Carlos Roque Monzón (7 August 1942 – 8 January 1995), nicknamed Escopeta (Shotgun in Spanish), was an Argentine professional boxer who held the undisputed world middleweight championship for 7 years. He successfully defended his title 14 times against 11 different fighters and is widely regarded as not only one of the best middleweights in history but also one of the greatest boxers of all time pound-for-pound. Known for his speed, punching power and relentless work rate, Monzon ended his career with a record of 87-3-9-1 with 59 knockouts, each one of his losses were early in his career and were avenged. Inducted into the International Boxing Hall of Fame in 1990, he was chosen by The Ring magazine in 2002 as the 11th greatest fighter of the last 80 years and voted him as the best middleweight title holder of the last 50 years in 2011. As of January 2018, Monzón holds the 2nd longest unified championship reign in middleweight history at 9 consecutive defenses. Monzón spent five and a half years in prison for killing his wife Alicia by throwing her off a balcony, and admitted that he had hit every single woman that he had dated.

Argentinians adored Monzón throughout his career. His glamorous and violent life was avidly followed both by the media and Argentine people. He was, however, accused many times of domestic violence by his two wives and many mistresses, and of beating paparazzi. Charged with killing his second wife Alicia Muñiz in 1988, the former champion was sentenced to 11 years in jail. He died in a January 1995 car crash while on his way back to jail after receiving a weekend furlough.

Early life
Monzón was born in the city of San Javier, Argentina, to a family of Mocoví descent. His parents were Roque Monzón and Amalia Ledesma. Monzón was raised in poverty with his twelve siblings. When Monzón was six years old, his family moved to Barranquitas Oeste, a poor neighborhood of Santa Fe, the capital of Santa Fe Province. To help out his family, he quit school in the third grade, working different jobs, such as shoeshiner, paperboy and milkman. As a youngster, he showed an interest in boxing.

When he was sixteen, he met Zulema Encarnación Torres, with whom he had his first son, Carlos Alberto Monzón. Later, on 11 May 1962, he married Mercedes Beatriz García, nicknamed 'Pelusa'. They were so poor that they did not have enough money to buy the marriage license. They had three kids: Silvia Beatriz, Abel Ricardo and Carlos Raúl (who was adopted).

Boxing beginnings

Monzón had his first amateur fight on 2 October 1959. This first fight ended in a draw. Three years later, after a 73-6-8 amateur record, he became a professional. His first professional bout was held on 6 February 1963. He knocked out his opponent in the second round. In 1966, he won the Argentine middleweight title. In 1967, he won the South American middleweight title. After this success, Argentine boxing promoter Juan Carlos Lectoure pushed him into the international boxing scene by organizing fights with foreign boxers such as Douglas Huntley, Charles Austin, Johnny Brooks, Harold Richardson, Tommy Bethea, Bennie Briscoe (a ten-round tie) Manoel Severino and Eddy Pace.

World middleweight champion Nino Benvenuti had long had a distinguished career that included championships in 2 divisions and 2 wins in 3 bouts vs all-time great Emile Griffith. He had lost the year before to American Tom Bethea in Australia, but in an actual title fight in Yugoslavia, he avenged that loss.

Nobody expected Monzón to beat Benvenuti in their title match (very few knew of him). Yet Monzón applied pressure from the start, and in the 12th, a right hand landed perfectly on Benvenuti's chin, and the title changed hands. Monzón also beat Benvenuti in a rematch, this time in only three rounds in Monte Carlo when Benvenuti's seconds threw in the towel.

Champion
In 1971, Monzón became only the second man to stop former three-time world champion Emile Griffith in 14 rounds, and later out-pointed him over 15 in a close fight (before the fight Monzón had to spar three rounds and run three miles in order to make the weight). Monzón then scored a win over tough Philadelphian Bennie Briscoe in their rematch, over-coming a shakey 9th round, in which Briscoe almost scored a knockout; a knockout in five rounds over European champion Tom Bogs, a knockout in seven rounds over Cuban-Mexican José Mantequilla Nápoles in Paris, France and a 10-round knockout of tough Tony Licata of New Orleans at the Madison Square Garden, in what would turn out to be Monzón's only fight in the United States.

Monzón's middleweight championship title was lifted in 1975 by the WBC for not defending it against mandatory challenger Rodrigo Valdez. Valdez, a Colombian, won the WBC's title, while Monzón kept the WBA's championship. In 1976, they finally met, this time, world champion vs. world champion.

Valdez's brother had been shot to death one week prior to the fight and he did not feel like fighting. Still, the fight went on, as they were both under contract. It took place in Monte Carlo. Monzón handed Valdez a beating, winning a 15-round unanimous decision and unifying the world title once again. Facing a lack of good challengers, Monzón was offered a high purse to again fight the Colombian.

The second fight was different. Monzón-Valdez II is a classic. Valdez came out roaring this time. In the second round, right cross to the chin put Monzón down for the first and only time in his career. Valdez built a lead through the first part of the fight. Monzón, however, mounted a brilliant comeback and outboxed Valdez for the last 8 rounds, winning a unanimous decision to retain the title and score his 14th title defense.

Retirement
Monzón retired after the second Valdez fight defense. His record stood at 87 wins, only three losses, nine draws and one no contest. Of his wins, 59 came by knockout. All three of his losses were on points, early in his career, and were all avenged. In 2003, he was named by the Ring Magazine as one of the 100 greatest punchers of all time. On the independent computer-based ranking of boxrec.com, he is listed as the second best middleweight boxer of all time.

Always known for his overhand right, following Monzón's victory over Mantequilla Nápoles, Angelo Dundee said: "Monzón is the complete fighter. He can box, he can hit, he can think, and he is game all the way."

Before retirement, in 1974, he starred in La Mary, a hit movie directed by Daniel Tinayre. After retirement, he participated as an actor in a couple of Argentine movies, which were not very successful, and TV shows.

A monument to him stands in Santa Fe, Argentina.

Personal life

Monzón was tremendously popular throughout his career. During Monzón's fights, Argentina would stand still, cities had no traffic, and all TV sets and radios were tuned to the fight. While filming La Mary, he met famous Argentine actress and model Susana Giménez. They started a tumultuous relationship, which led to Monzón's divorce. Since then, his glamorous and sometimes violent life was avidly followed by the media. He toured Latin America and Europe with Argentine models and actresses.

While still a champion, a darker side of Monzón began to emerge. In 1973, Monzón was shot in the leg by his then wife of 11 years, Mercedes Beatriz García, with whom he had a daughter and two sons (one of whom was adopted). The shooting required seven hours of surgery to remove the bullet from Monzón's leg. In 1975, he began a very publicized romance with Susana Giménez; they had previously met in the 1974 thriller La Mary, directed by Daniel Tinayre, where the two played husband and wife. Monzón hated paparazzi who detailed his affairs. He went to Italy with Giménez to participate in a movie, and started increasingly traveling with her to locations in Brazil and the rest of Latin America, allowing himself be seen with her, although still legally married. He was accused of domestic violence and of beating paparazzi.

Monzón was repeatedly detained by the police. Giménez began wearing sunglasses more often, presumably to hide her bruises, and many times, paparazzi had to be hospitalized from the beatings suffered at the hands of Monzón, who had unpredictable violent outbreaks. During this period, Monzón and Mercedes Beatriz Garcia finally divorced.

Susana Giménez left him in 1978. After the breakup, Monzón's private life was fairly low key for a number of years. In 1979, he met Uruguayan model Alicia Muñiz, with whom he had an on-and-off relationship for many years. They eventually married and had a son together, Maximiliano Roque. But his violent behavior continued. On February 14, 1988, while vacationing in the resort city of Mar del Plata, after a heated argument, he beat Muñiz. According to the investigation after this incident, he strangled her into unconsciousness, picked her up, and pushed her off the second floor balcony, killing her, during which he followed her in the fall, injuring his shoulder. On July 3, 1989, Monzón was found guilty of homicide. He received an 11-year prison sentence.

In January 1995, Monzón was given a weekend furlough while serving his term in Cárcel de Las Flores, Santa Fe Province, to visit his family and children. On 8 January 1995, when on his way to returning to jail after the weekend, he and a passenger, Gerónimo Domingo Mottura, were killed instantly when their vehicle rolled over near Santa Rosa de Calchines. The other passenger, Monzón's sister-in-law Alicia Guadalupe Fessia, was injured.

Even in death, Monzón drew a crowd. Thousands sang "Dale campeón" ("Go Champ") during his funeral.

Professional boxing record

See also
List of middleweight boxing champions
List of WBC world champions
List of WBA world champions

References

External links

Carlos "Escopeta" Monzón - IBHOF Biography
Sports Illustrated, 8 August 1977, Volume 47, Issue 6

|-

|-

|-

|-

1942 births
1995 deaths
Argentine male boxers
Middleweight boxers
Sportspeople from Santa Fe, Argentina
World Boxing Association champions
World Boxing Council champions
World boxing champions
International Boxing Hall of Fame inductees
Argentine prisoners and detainees
Argentine people convicted of murder
People convicted of murder by Argentina
Prisoners and detainees of Argentina
Road incident deaths in Argentina
Sportspeople convicted of murder